"Glimpse of Us" is a song by Japanese singer Joji, released as the lead single from his third studio album Smithereens on 10 June 2022 through 88rising and Warner Records. It was written by Alexis Kesselman, Castle, Riley McDonough, and producer Connor McDonough. The song became Joji's most successful hit single to date, having peaked at number one in Australia, Indonesia, Lithuania, Malaysia, New Zealand, the Philippines, and Singapore, number two on the Global 200, and within the top 10 in Canada, Ireland, Norway, the United States and Vietnam.

Following its release, "Glimpse of Us" broke a series of records. It became the first song by an Asian artist to reach number one on Spotify's Global chart, remaining there for 10 consecutive days. With the song's debut in tenth place on the Billboard Hot 100, it became the second song by a Japanese artist to reach the top 10 after Kyu Sakamoto's "Sukiyaki" in 1963. It also marked the first debut of an Asian soloist directly in the top 10, as well as his fifth entry on the chart. The song also topped the New Zealand and Australian singles, becoming Joji's first number-one single. The song received a nomination for Song of the Year at the ARIA Awards 2022 in Australia, due to Joji being part Australian on his father's side.

Critical reception
The song received widespread acclaim, with critics praising its simplicity, lyrics and Joji's emotional vocals. Brenton Blanchet of Complex described the song as a "chilling piano ballad", while Jon Caramanica of The New York Times considered it "splendid and striking". Andrea See of Bandwagon Asia felt that the "stripped-down" sound of the song "foreshadows Joji's more mature sonic territory" in contrast to his previous electronic material.

Music video
The song was accompanied by its music video, directed by Dan Streit. The video contains various scenes of tomfoolery committed by "anonymous protagonists," including in race cars. Clips from the video became popular on TikTok, leading the music video to gain tens of millions of views. The video was shot on a Sony DCR-HC32 miniDV and consisted of 15 hours of raw footage before editing. The video was primarily shot in Atlanta, with additional scenes shot in Tennessee, Alabama, Los Angeles and New York.

Commercial performance
"Glimpse of Us" became Joji's highest-charting single upon its debut in various countries, including Australia, New Zealand, Philippines and the UK. It debuted at number ten on the US Billboard Hot 100, marking Joji's first top-ten single in the country. For the chart dated 2 July 2022, the song peaked at number eight.

With "Glimpse of Us", Joji became the second Japanese artist to have a number one single on the Australian singles chart, and first since Kyu Sakamoto's "Sukiyaki" in 1963.

Charts

Weekly charts

Year-end charts

Certifications

References

2022 songs
2022 singles
2020s ballads
Joji (musician) songs
Alternative pop songs
Pop ballads
Number-one singles in Australia
Number-one singles in Malaysia
Number-one singles in New Zealand
Number-one singles in the Philippines
Number-one singles in Singapore
Warner Records singles